Tribolium  is a genus of African plants in the grass family, native to South Africa and neighboring countries.

 Species

References

Danthonioideae
Poaceae genera